Pelicans at the Zoo is an 1898 British short black-and-white silent actuality film, produced by British Mutoscope & Biograph Company, featuring pelicans being released for feeding into their enclosure at London Zoological Gardens. The film was part of a series, with Elephants at the Zoo, which were one of the earliest examples of animal life on film.

See also
 Pelicans, London Zoological Gardens, 1896 film

References

External links 
 

British black-and-white films
British silent short films
Films set in zoos
1898 short films
1890s British films
Films about birds
Films shot in London